The Abdus Salam Centre for Physics ,  is a federally-funded research institute and national laboratory site managed by the Quaid-i-Azam University for the Ministry of Energy (MoE) of the Government of Pakistan.

Originally founded as National Centre for Physics in 1999, the site is dedicated for understanding and advancement of the physical sciences and mathematical logic— the site is located in Islamabad in Pakistan. The site closely collaborates and operates under the quadripartite supervision of International Center for Theoretical Physics (ICTP) in Italy, CERN in Switzerland, and the Pakistan Atomic Energy Commission (PAEC) on behalf of Ministry of Energy, Pakistan.

It is focused towards dissemination of knowledge in frontiers of physics for the universities and teaching organizations. The site endeavors to break the isolation of Pakistan's top scientists by offering them the opportunity to work with foreign scientists who are invited to lecture and also to participate in the sites research activities on a regular basis.

History

Origins
Establishing world-class physics research institutes was proposed by a number of scientists. The roots of NCP institutes go back to when Nobel laureate professor Abdus Salam, after receiving his doctorate in physics, came back to Pakistan in 1951. Joining his alma mater, Government College University as Professor of Mathematics in 1951, Salam made an effort to establish the physics institute but was unable to do so. The same year, he became chairman of the Mathematics Department of the Punjab University where he tried to revolutionise the department by introducing the course of Quantum Mechanics necessary for undergraduate students, but it was soon reverted by the vice-chancellor. He soon faced the choice between intellectual death or migration to the stimulating environment of a western institutions. This choice, however, left a deep impression on him and was behind his determination to create an institution to which physicists from developing countries would come as a right to interact with their peers from industrially advanced countries without permanently leaving their own countries. This resulted in founding to the International Centre for Theoretical Physics (ICTP) by Professor Abdus Salam in Italy.

INSC and INP
In 1974, Prof. Abdus Salam visualised the need of an institution where experts from the industrialised nations and learners from the developing countries could get together for a couple of weeks once a year to exchange views on various subjects of current interest in Physics and allied sciences. His suggestion was accepted by Chairman of Pakistan Atomic Energy Commission (PAEC) Munir Ahmad Khan and it was the year 1976 when the first International Nathiagali Summer College on Physics and Contemporary Needs (INSC) was inaugurated at Nathiagali, with co-sponsorship of ICTP and PAEC, under the directorship of Prof. Riazuddin, a student of Abdus Salam. The same year, Ishfaq Ahmad established the Institute of Nuclear Physics at the University of Engineering and Technology of Lahore where Abdus Salam was invited to give first lectures on particle physics and quantum mechanics.

Since then, it has been regularly held without break and it is a great credit to Prof. Riazuddin for his dedication and commitment as such type of international scientific gathering in a developing country like Pakistan presents a major step for the promotion of science. A major aim and goal, Prof. Abdus Salam had in his mind when he made his original proposal to PAEC in 1974 that Nathiagali Summer College would evolve into a full-fledged Centre for Physics on the pattern of ICTP. To transform his vision to reality, his student Prof. Riazuddin played a major role.

Foundation
The National Centre for Physics came into reality when Prof. Riazuddin arranged a one-day symposium on Frontiers of Fundamental Physics on 27 January 1999 at the Institute of Physics of Quaid-e-Azam University, only seven months before the recent tests, (Chagai-I). All the leading scientists of the country and some visitors from CERN attended this symposium and they provided their support. Prof. Riazuddin being the founding father of NCP, was its first Director-General and it was inaugurated by Dr. Ishfaq Ahmad, Chairman of Pakistan Atomic Energy Commission during this period, on 16 May 2000. The Director General of European Organization for Nuclear Research (CERN), Dr. Luciano Maiani and distinguished members of his delegation, the Vice-Chancellor of Quaid-i-Azam University, Dr. Tariq Saddiqui and other dignitaries, witnessed the inauguration. The first academic faculty of this institute were included Munir Ahmad Khan, Pervez Hoodbhoy, Fiazuddin, Masud Ahmad, and Ishfaq Ahmad, who first presented their physics papers to the institutes and CERN.

In 2008, Dr. Hamid Saleem became its Director-General after, his predecessor and founding father of NCP, Prof. Riazuddin, who was made lifetime Director General Emeritus. The vision of Prof. Riazuddin to make NCP one of the leading Physics institute of Pakistan is now being carried by Dr. Hamid Saleem.

NCP offers research in different branches of Physics such as particle Physics, computational physics, Astrophysics, Cosmology, Atmospheric physics, Atomic, molecular, and optical physics, Chemical physics, Condensed matter physics, (Fluid dynamics, Laser Physics, Mathematical physics, Plasma Physics·, Quantum field theory, Nano Physics, Quantum information theory.

Collaboration with CERN
NCP is collaborating with CERN in the field of experimental high-energy physics. NCP and CERN are involved in the development, testing and fabrication of 432 Resistive Plate Chambers (RPC) required for the CMS muon detector at CERN. The RPC has an excellent time resolution i.e. of the order of 1–2 nanoseconds and it will be used for the bunch tagging at LHC. At the national level, this project is a joint collaboration of NCP and PAEC, whereas at international level, NCP also collaborating with Italy, China, South Korea and US.

The RPC is a gaseous detector made using two parallel-plates of bakelite with high resistivity. Each RPC for CMS will be equipped with 96 electronic channels, which will be readout are based on 0.14 micrometre BiCMOS technology. For the complete system, number of readout channels are around 50,000. RNCP has an experimental high energy physics laboratory which is equipped with the high speed and advanced data acquisition system based on VME standards. This laboratory is used for prototyping and testing of RPCs at present.

National Centre for Physics organized a three-day Grid Technology Workshop in Islamabad, Pakistan in collaboration with European Organization for Nuclear Research (CERN), Geneva from 20 to 22 October 2003. The main objective of the workshop was to provide hands-on experience to Pakistani scientists, engineers and professionals on Grid technology.

Advanced Scientific Computing
High performance and data intense computing is the back bone of modern-day science. There are stringent requirements for computing at LHC. To exploit the full physics potential of LHC data in comprehensive manner. NCP will require high performance computing for accelerator physics, computational condensed matter physics and theoretical particle physics. For accessing and managing the LHC data novel techniques like the concept of data and computing grids are used. CERN has evolved a new project called the LHC Computing Grid (LCG). NCP is a partner of CERN in this project and it is the only LCG node in Pakistan.

International Centre for Theoretical Physics (ICTP)
NCP signed a memorandum of understanding during dr. K. R. Sreenivasan, Director ICTP's visit to Pakistan from 26 to 30 June 2005. In addition, the Centre carries out research in areas that are not covered by any institute of Physics. One such area being pursued by the Centre involves a number of activities in Experimental High-Energy Physics through a co-operative agreement with CERN in Geneva, Switzerland. Besides this, NCP has collaborations with several international institutes and universities in the field of theoretical physics including AS-ICTP, Trieste, Italy; Centre for Plasma Astrophysics (CPA), K-Leuven University, Belgium; Tokyo University, Tokyo, Japan; Ruhr University, Bochum (RUB), Germany and many others. Several research papers are published in reputed international journals each year from NCP through national and international collaborations.

Project and activities
 The Synchrotron Radiation Source (SRS), now deactivated.
 Grid Computing for LHC Data Analysis
Pelletron (accelerator), an electron accelerator previously known as ERLP (Energy Recovery Linac Prototype).
 Tandem electrostatic accelerators, a negatively charged ion gains energy by attraction to the very high positive voltage at the geometric centre of the pressure vessel.
 The New Light Source, a project which has evolved from the previous 4GLS project.
 Monte Carlo Generators, an electron accelerator.
 Compact Muon Solenoid

Global co-operation
RNCP and the Other independent countries have signed formal Memorandum of Understanding agreements are below:

  European Commission

See also
 Riazuddin (physicist)
 Munir Ahmad Khan
 Ishfaq Ahmad
 Pervez Hoodbhoy
 Pakistan Atomic Energy Commission (PAEC)
 European Organization for Nuclear Research
 International Centre for Theoretical Physics

Notes
Notes

References

External links
 National Centre for Physics
 CERN page on NCP
 https://web.archive.org/web/20110725200841/http://www.cpe-khi.org/activities.html
 https://web.archive.org/web/20100611073022/http://www.gafp.org.pk/members.htm

Energy in Pakistan
Nuclear technology in Pakistan
Pakistan federal departments and agencies
Physics laboratories
Synchrotron radiation facilities
Research institutes in Pakistan
Science and technology in Pakistan
International nuclear energy organizations
Laboratories in Pakistan
Nuclear research institutes
Particle physics facilities
International research institutes
Physics institutes
Plasma physics facilities
Neutron facilities
Constituent institutions of Pakistan Atomic Energy Commission
Nawaz Sharif administration
Mathematical institutes
1999 establishments in Pakistan
Abdus Salam
Institutes associated with CERN
Quaid-i-Azam University